KWAC (1490 AM) is a Spanish language sports radio station serving the Bakersfield, California, area as a TUDN Radio affiliate. This station is under ownership of Lotus Communications.  Its studios are located in southwest Bakersfield, while its transmitter is located south of downtown Bakersfield.

History
KWAC went on the air in 1956 as KMAP, owned by Morris Mindel. The station was sold in 1958 and became KWAC in 1961 when its owner, KMAP, Inc., was sold. The station was previously an affiliate of ESPN Deportes Radio. After ESPN Deportes Radio was discontinued on September 8, 2019, the station became an affiliate of TUDN Radio.

References

External links
 

WAC
WAC (AM)
Lotus Communications stations